This is a glossary of arithmetic and diophantine geometry in mathematics, areas growing out of the traditional study of Diophantine equations to encompass large parts of number theory and algebraic geometry. Much of the theory is in the form of proposed conjectures, which can be related at various levels of generality.

Diophantine geometry in general is the study of algebraic varieties V over fields K that are finitely generated over their prime fields—including as of special interest number fields and finite fields—and over local fields. Of those, only the complex numbers are algebraically closed; over any other K the existence of points of V with coordinates in K is something to be proved and studied as an extra topic, even knowing the geometry of V.

Arithmetic geometry can be more generally defined as the study of schemes of finite type over the spectrum of the ring of integers. Arithmetic geometry has also been defined as the application of the techniques of algebraic geometry to problems in number theory.



A

B

C

D

E

F

G

H

I

K

L

M

N

O

Q

R

S

T

U

V

W

See also
Arithmetic topology
Arithmetic dynamics

References

Further reading
Dino Lorenzini (1996), An invitation to arithmetic geometry, AMS Bookstore, 

Diophantine geometry
Algebraic geometry
Geometry
Wikipedia glossaries using description lists